Antonio Napolitano (born 16 February 1999) is an Argentine professional footballer who plays as a midfielder for Gimnasia La Plata.

Club career
In 2005, Napolitano joined Gimnasia y Esgrima; aged six. He spent the next fifteen years progressing through El Lobo's academy, notably moving into the reserves in 2016. On 25 February 2020, Napolitano was selected on the first-team's bench by manager Diego Maradona for a Copa Argentina round of sixty-four tie with Sportivo Barracas; though went unused. On 21 January 2021, he signed his first professional contract; penning terms until 2023. Napolitano's senior debut soon arrived, as he replaced Johan Carbonero in stoppage time of a Copa de la Liga Profesional victory over Talleres on 19 February; aged twenty-two.

International career
In March 2018, Napolitano received a training call-up from the Argentina U19s.

Style of play
Napolitano started out as an attacking midfielder, before transitioning into an all-rounder in midfield. He played in every position except goalkeeper and winger at various points in his youth career.

Personal life
Napolitano is the son of Christian Napolitano, who also had a stint in the academy of Gimnasia y Esgrima; as did his uncle, José Luis, and cousin, Lautaro.

Career statistics
.

Notes

References

External links

1999 births
Living people
Argentine footballers
Argentine expatriate footballers
Footballers from La Plata
Association football midfielders
Club de Gimnasia y Esgrima La Plata footballers
Iraklis Thessaloniki F.C. players
Argentine Primera División players
Super League Greece 2 players
Argentine expatriate sportspeople in Greece
Expatriate footballers in Greece